The 2019 Intermediate League World Series took place from July 28–August 4 in Livermore, California. McCalla, Alabama defeated Matamoros, Mexico in the championship game. This was the last Intermediate Little League World Series prior to the COVID-19 pandemic.

Teams

Results

United States BracketInternational BracketConsolation roundElimination Round'''

References

Intermediate League World Series
Intermediate League World Series
Intermediate League World Series
Intermediate League World Series
Intermediate League World Series